Fabrizio Viola (born in 1958 in Rome) is an Italian banker.

Biography 
Fabrizio Viola is a graduate in business administration from the Bocconi University.

From 1990 to 2011, he held various positions at the IMI Group, the Fondiaria Group and the Banca Popolare di Vicenza. From 2004 to 2008, he was the CEO of the Banca Popolare di Milano.

From May 2012 to 2016, he was the CEO and general manager of Banca Monte dei Paschi di Siena, the oldest bank in the world. He was later employed by Banca Popolare di Vicenza as CEO and sister bank Veneto Banca as director. After the banks were in liquidation, Viola was assigned as one of the liquidator. In February 2018, he became a senior advisor for the Boston Consulting Group.

Starting in 2015, he was under investigation for alleged false accounting and market manipulation during his tenure as CEO of Banca Monte dei Paschi di Siena. He 2020, he was found guilty of those charges.

References

Italian bankers
Living people
Italian chief executives
1958 births